Seed counting machines count seeds for research and packaging purposes. The machines typically provide total counts of seeds or batch sizes for packaging.

Background
The first seed counters were developed to count legumes and other seeds which were large.

Traditionally, the seed packaging industry packed seeds by weight but sold them by number.  In order to assure the correct quantity of seeds, the distributors added a safety margin to the packed weight, like a bakers' dozen.  This safety margin increased cost.  By counting the seeds, the margin of error could be reduced and so costs reduced.

History

Originally people counted seeds by hand, or used a trip board. The first seed-counting machine was the vibratory mechanical seed counter. Modern day electronic seed counters are faster and more accurate. A color-image-based seed sorter was developed which can sort various things by their color.

In 1929 the US Bureau of Plant Industry worked with several seed companies to perfect a seed counter. In 1962 an electric seed counter was developed by the USDA's Agricultural Marketing Service. The electronic counter operation involved the a vibrating the seeds so that they move to the edge of the counting machine.

The machine will pay for itself over the labor intensive tedious task of manually counting seeds, which is necessarily characterized by human error.  By contrast, the new devices, even in the early 1960s, boasted increased speed and “about 1 error in counting 10,000 seeds counted.” The accuracy helps lessen the need to build in safety margins for quantity; and the costs of the machinery can be more than paid for by reduced labor costs.

In the 1970s other electronic seed counting advancements included an electric eye to count the seeds. Seed counting still involved vibrating the seed, but now the seed would fall through a seed hole.

If the items are put onto the conveyor in a single file, then a simple counting mechanism may provide satisfactory results. However, such a mechanism is inherently slower than if the items were freely placed on the conveyor without posing such limitations. Thus, in the 2000s other parallel counting of multiple objects evolved, including devices that use multiple electromagnetic energy sources and receptors.

Technology
At one time, the methodology included use of vacuum tubes, vacuum pumps, a light source and a photo transistor.  The size needed to be adjusted so only one seed passes through at a time.  To be useful, batch counters need to be commercially available.  A single preset count facility is a plus, as is “adequate count capacity, the ability to provide external power supplies and [control of] ... the means to stop the picking up and counting of seeds.”

In commercial operations, it is important for the counter to be automatic and accurate.  For example, one commercial counter is capable of measuring the hundredth/thousandth grain weight for seeds, tablets, pearls, and small components. It adopts far-infrared area sensor, and a large enough photosensitive area, "suitable for the sensitivity of all crops (millet-peanut)." Blockages or splashes are to be avoided.  Adaptable speed variation adjustment helps "solve the contradiction between speed and accuracy, and ensure error-free counting (counting error of 0/1000)"  Manual feeding vs automatic cup changing "improve the counting efficiency, reduce labor intensity."  Automatic discharge can obviate demands for the operator to constantly feed the vibrating plate.  One counter is so fast that Millet "counting can reach 2000 grains/min, and the wheat and rice counting"  Suitability of the vibrating plate for different seeds is a consideration.  It is useful to have an adjustable baffle at the exit of the bowl "according to the diameter of the seeds (workpieces), only one seed (workpiece) at a time, not side by side, for all large and small seeds."

Some seed counters use laser light.

In counting, it is important to position one seed at a time by manipulating slit width when using a Photoelectric seed counter.  It can be an integral part of a Seed drill.

Some are able to handle up to 23 sample containers.  They can do this while maintaining notable accuracy.  General purpose electronic seed counters usually count seeds during free fall. They have achieved satisfactory error rates.  For example: "Counting errors of less than 0.4% at counting speeds of 400 to 1,180 seeds/min were obtained for seeds of nine different species ranging in size from corn (Zea mays L.) to trefoil (Lotus corniculatus L.). Under some conditions, the seed dispenser, a vibratory small parts feeder, segregated wheat kernels (Triticum aestivum L.) into weight classes dispensing heavier kernels first into the counting system."

Gallery

See also

Agricultural machinery industry
List of agricultural machinery
Mechanised agriculture
 Seed drill (box drill, air drill)

References

Notes

Citations

External links
Dodder counting machine

20th-century inventions
Agricultural machinery
Harvest
History of agriculture
Packaging machinery